LINPACK is a software library for performing numerical linear algebra on digital computers.
It was written in Fortran by Jack Dongarra, Jim Bunch, Cleve Moler, and Gilbert Stewart, and was intended for use on supercomputers in the 1970s and early 1980s.  It has been largely superseded by LAPACK, which runs more efficiently on modern architectures.

LINPACK makes use of the BLAS (Basic Linear Algebra Subprograms) libraries for performing basic vector and matrix operations.

The LINPACK benchmarks appeared initially as part of the LINPACK user's manual. The parallel LINPACK benchmark implementation called HPL (High Performance Linpack) is used to benchmark and rank supercomputers for the TOP500 list.

References

Benchmarks (computing)
Fortran libraries
Numerical linear algebra
Numerical software